XHDCP-FM is a community radio station in Ario de Rosales, Michoacán, broadcasting on 88.3 FM. XHDCP is owned by De Corazón Purépecha, A.C.

History
XHDCP received its social community concession on November 14, 2016.

References

Radio stations in Michoacán
Community radio stations in Mexico
Radio stations established in 2016